Tabon Island is an island located in the province of Aklan in the Philippines. The island is enclosed in Tinagong Dagat (Hidden sea), a bay in the province with a narrow opening to the Sibuyan Sea.  

Tabon is an island-barangay, one of the twenty barangays of the historic municipality of Batan in Aklan, the home of the alleged Datu Kalantiaw in pre-colonial Philippines.  The barangay has a population of 902 as of August 1, 2007.

References

External links 
 Tabon Island

Islands of Aklan